White River may refer to:

Bodies of water

Africa 
 Bakoy River, in West Africa, called the White River over a portion of its length

Canada 
 White River (British Columbia)
 White River (Vancouver Island), a river in the Discovery Passage–Johnstone Strait watersheds of British Columbia
 White River Provincial Park
 White River (Nass River), a river in the Marcus Passage watershed of British Columbia
 White River (Quebec)
 White River (Yukon)
 White River (Ontario)

China
 White River (China), an old name for the Hai River

Dominica
 White River (Dominica)

Estonia 
 Valgejõgi, or "white river", in northern Estonia

Iran 
 Sefīd-Rūd, or "the white river", in Gilan province

Jamaica 
 White River (Jamaica), a river

New Zealand 
 White River, New Zealand, a river in the South Island

Montserrat
 White River, Montserrat, a former river in Montserrat

United Kingdom 
St Austell River, a river in Cornwall also known as the White River

United States 
 White River (Arizona), a tributary of the Salt River
 White River (Arkansas–Missouri), a tributary of the Mississippi River in Arkansas and southern Missouri
 White River (California), in Tulare County
 White River (Indiana), a large tributary of the Wabash River 
 White River (White Lake), a river in Michigan
 White River (Huron County, Michigan), a tributary of Lake Huron
 White River (Nevada) 
 White River (Oregon), a tributary of the Deschutes River 
 White River (Missouri River tributary), a tributary of the Missouri River in Nebraska and South Dakota
 White River (Texas), a tributary of the Brazos River of Texas
 White River (Green River tributary), a tributary of the Green River in Utah
 White River (Price River tributary), a tributary of the Price River in Utah
 White River (Vermont), a tributary of the Connecticut River 
 White River (Puyallup River), a tributary of the Puyallup River in Washington State 
 White River (Lake Wenatchee), a tributary of Lake Wenatchee in Washington State
 "White River", an old name of the Cuyahoga River in Ohio
 White River (Wisconsin), a tributary of the Fox River in Wisconsin

Places

Canada
 White River, Ontario, a township

Solomon Islands
 White River, Honiara, the largest settlement in West Honiara

South Africa
 White River, Mpumalanga, a town in Mpumalanga Province

United States
 Whiteriver, Arizona, a census-designated place
White River, Indiana, an unincorporated community in Gibson County
 White River Junction, Vermont, a town where the White River flows into the Connecticut River
 White River National Forest, a national forest in northwest Colorado
 White River, South Dakota, a town in Mellette County, South Dakota
 White River State Park, an Indiana State Park just west of downtown Indianapolis
 White River (community), Wisconsin, an unincorporated community in Ashland County
 White River, Wisconsin, a town in Ashland County

Other
 White River Bridge, over the White River in Mount Rainier National Park
 White River Utes, a branch of the Ute people
 White River War, an 1879 conflict between the White River Ute Indians and the United States Army

See also

 White River Fauna, fossil animals discovered near White River (Missouri River tributary)
 White River Formation, a geological formation named for White River (Missouri River tributary)
 White River Township (disambiguation)
In other languages:
Belaya River (disambiguation) (Russian)
 Byala Reka (disambiguation) (Bulgarian)
 Bela Reka (disambiguation) (Serbo-Croatian)
 Bijela (river) (disambiguation) (Serbo-Croatian)
 Rivière Blanche (disambiguation) (French)
 Río Blanco (disambiguation) (Spanish)
 Belareca (Romanian)